Sétimo Sentido is a Brazilian telenovela produced and broadcast by TV Globo. It premiered on 29 March 1982 and ended on 8 October 1982, with a total of 167 episodes. It's the twenty eighth "novela das oito" to be aired on the timeslot. It is created and written by Janete Clair and directed by Roberto Talma.

Cast 
Regina Duarte - Luana Camará/Priscilla Capricce
Francisco Cuoco - Sebastião Bento (Tião Bento)
Eva Todor - Maria Santa Bergman Rivoredo (Santinha Rivoredo)
Carlos Alberto Riccelli - Rodolfo Bergman Rivoredo (Rudy)
Cláudio Cavalcanti - Danilo Mendes
Natália do Vale - Sandra Bergman Rivoredo
Tamara Taxman - Gisela Rezende (Gisa)
Fernando Torres - Harold Bergman
Armando Bógus - Valério
Beth Goulart - Helenice
Paulo Guarnieri - Antônio Bergman Rivoredo (Tony)
Nicette Bruno - Sara Mendes
Sebastião Vasconcellos - Elísio Mendes
Ênio Santos - Tomás Rezende
Heloísa Helena - Augusta
Ruth de Souza - Jerusa
Adriano Reys - Renard
Lisa Vieira - Érika Rezende
Otávio Augusto - Jorge
Myriam Pérsia - Mapy Hilder
Edwin Luisi - Rubens
Jonas Bloch - Jaime
Jacqueline Laurence - Célia
Miriam Pires - Carolina
Edney Giovenazzi - Sampaio
Maria Della Costa - Juliana
Jacyra Silva - Pérola
Lajar Muzuris - Domingos
Irma Alvarez - Vanda
Reinaldo Gonzaga - Gilson Pratini
Sônia Clara - Diana Bergman
Terezinha Sodré - Rita
Fernando Eiras - Henrique Bergman
Neuza Caribé - Uiara
Tânia Boscoli - Alba Rezende
David Pinheiro - Padre Gustavo
Monique Alves - Rosinha
Patrícia Phebo - Cristina
Cássia Foureaux - Ângela
Nilson Acioly - Kico
 Izabella Bicalho - Cila

References

External links 
 

TV Globo telenovelas
1982 telenovelas
Brazilian telenovelas
1982 Brazilian television series debuts
1982 Brazilian television series endings
Portuguese-language telenovelas
Telenovelas about spiritism